Drive Live is the title of the fourth live album by singer-songwriter Judie Tzuke, recorded during her 2002 UK tour and was released the same year.

Track listing
 "We'll Go Dreaming" (adapted version, from Turning Stones)
 "Don't Look Behind You" (from Queen Secret Keeper)
 "Parallel Lives" (from Under the Angels)
 "The One That Got Away" (from Queen Secret Keeper)
 "Left Hand Talking" (from Left Hand Talking)
 "Two Mountains" (from Under the Angels)
 "Bring the Rain" (from Welcome to the Cruise)
 "Late Again" (from Shoot the Moon)
 "On Days like These" (from Queen Secret Keeper)
 "Indian Giver" (from Queen Secret Keeper)
 "Molly" (from Sports Car)
 "Drive" (from Queen Secret Keeper)
 "Sukarita" (from Welcome to the Cruise)
 "Lion" (from Queen Secret Keeper)
 "One Minute" (from Queen Secret Keeper)
 "The Choices You've Made" (from Sports Car)

References
Official website

Judie Tzuke albums
2002 live albums